Patrick Walter Shaw (15 February 1872 – 14 September 1940) was an Irish politician and businessman. He owned several premises in Mullingar (and a number of racehorses) and sat on a number of public bodies, including Mullingar Town Commissioners and Westmeath County Council.

He was first elected to Dáil Éireann as a Cumann na nGaedheal Teachta Dála (TD) for the Longford–Westmeath constituency at the 1923 general election. He was re-elected at each subsequent election until he retired from politics at the 1933 general election.

He was married to Mary Galligan, and they had six children; four sons and two daughters. One of his sons was Francis Shaw, a Jesuit priest, Celtic scholar and historian.

References

1872 births
1940 deaths
Cumann na nGaedheal TDs
Members of the 4th Dáil
Members of the 5th Dáil
Members of the 6th Dáil
Members of the 7th Dáil
People educated at Castleknock College